Iglenik pri Veliki Loki is a small village east of Velika Loka in the Municipality of Trebnje in eastern Slovenia. The municipality is included in the Southeast Slovenia Statistical Region. The entire area is part of the traditional region of Lower Carniola.

Name
The name of the settlement was changed from Iglenik to Iglenik pri Veliki Loki in 1953.

References

External links
Iglenik pri Veliki Loki at Geopedia

Populated places in the Municipality of Trebnje